

Sougou Kakutougi: Astral Bout

 is a Super Famicom video game based on various forms of fighting styles found in the Japanese combat sport promotion Fighting Network Rings.

Gameplay

This video game was the predecessor to mixed martial arts promotion companies and pay-per-view tournaments like the Ultimate Fighting Championship that are popular with today's young people.

There are nine different styles of fighting to adopt: professional wrestling, boxing, karate, sambo, muay thai, kung-fu, judo, kickboxing and lucha libre, and the basic set of martial arts. Like in an arcade fighting game, each player has a limited amount of continues that eventually lead to a "game over" if they all are allowed to expire. Three different modes to this game; standard one-player, two-player, or a "player vs. CPU" sparring session. All competitors have health meters that are divided into three between rounds to keep track of the strength in the arms, legs, and the rest of the body. The difficulty level can be set for either low, medium, or high.

Rope breaks are possible to pull off; like in professional wrestling. However, all matches end in a 10-count fall instead of pinning the opponent for a 3-count. There are a certain number of rounds with a pre-determined time limit (ranging from one-minute fights to endurance events).

Fighters

There are nine fighters in the game with different fighting styles which are
Barnov Gainer, A Sambo Grappler from Russia,
Somchai Pet Noi, a Muay Thai Fighter from Thailand,
Akira Maeda, a Professional Wrestler from Japan,
Kenji Takezawa, a Karate Expert from Japan,
Shiro Kimura, a Judo Expert from Japan,
James Taylor, a Heavyweight Boxing Champion from America,
Lee Wang-Yu, a Kung-Fu Master from China,
Billy J. Gibson, a Kickboxing Champion from America,
Spell Falcon, a Lucha Libre Star from Mexico

Sougou Kakutougi: Astral Bout 2 - The Total Fighters

Sougou Kakutougi Rings: Astral Bout 3

Reception
On release, Famicom Tsūshin scored the game a 21 out of 40.

References

External links
 Sougou Kakutougi: Astral Bout at MobyGames
 Sougou Kakutougi: Astral Bout at GameFAQs
 Sougou Kakutougi: Astral Bout at SuperFamicom.org

1992 video games
Fighting games
Japan-exclusive video games
Side-scrolling video games
Super Nintendo Entertainment System games
Super Nintendo Entertainment System-only games
Video game franchises introduced in 1992
Multiplayer and single-player video games
Video games developed in Japan